This is a list of inventions followed by name of the inventor (or whomever else it is named after). For other lists of eponyms (names derived from people) see Lists of etymologies.

The list

A to F

 Abney level – William de Wiveleslie Abney
 Aldis lamp – Arthur Cyril Webb Aldis
 Aldrin – Kurt Alder
 Alexanderson alternator – Ernst Alexanderson
 Algorithm – Muḥammad ibn Mūsā al-Khwārizmī
 Anderson shelter – John Anderson, 1st Viscount Waverley
 Anderton Shearer Loader – James Anderton
 Appertization – Nicolas Appert
 Archimedes' screw – Archimedes
 Argand lamp – Aimé Argand
 Armstrong breech-loading gun – William Armstrong, 1st Baron Armstrong
 Armstrong's acid – Henry Edward Armstrong
 Austenite – William Chandler Roberts-Austen
 Auston switch - David H. Auston
 Avtomat Kalashnikova (AK-47) – Mikhail Kalashnikov
 Bailey bridge – Donald Bailey
 Bakelite – Leo Baekeland
 Barlow lens, Barlow's wheel – Peter Barlow
 Bath Oliver – William Oliver
 Beaufort scale – Sir Francis Beaufort
 Beecham's Pills – Thomas Beecham
 Belisha beacon – Leslie Hore-Belisha, 1st Baron Hore-Belisha
 Benedict's reagent – Stanley Rossiter Benedict
 Benson raft – Simon Benson
 Bessemer converter – Henry Bessemer
 Billinghurst Requa Battery – William Billinghurst and Josephus Requa
 Birch gun – Noel Birch
 Bird's Custard – Alfred Bird
 Biro – László Bíró
 Blacker Bombard – Stewart Blacker
 Bloomers – Amelia Bloomer
 Botts' dots – Elbert Dysart Botts
 Bourdon gauge – Eugène Bourdon
 Bowden cable – Ernest Monnington Bowden
 Bowie knife – James Bowie
 Bowler hat – Thomas and William Bowler
 Bradshaw's Railway Guide – George Bradshaw
 Braille – Louis Braille
 Bramah Press – Joseph Bramah
 Brannock device – Charles F. Brannock
 Brennan torpedo – Louis Brennan
 Brougham – Henry Brougham, 1st Baron Brougham and Vaux
 M1918 Browning Automatic Rifle – John Browning
 Büchner funnel, Büchner flask – Ernst Büchner
 Bunsen burner – Robert Bunsen
 Burr Arch Truss – Theodore Burr
 Callanetics – Callan Pinckney
 Cardigan – James Brudenell, 7th Earl of Cardigan
 Carnot cycle, Carnot heat engine – Nicolas Léonard Sadi Carnot
 Cassegrain telescope – Laurent Cassegrain
 Catherine Wheel – Catherine of Alexandria
 Chippendale chair, Chippendale furniture – Thomas Chippendale
 Clerihew – Edmund Clerihew Bentley
 Coade stone – Eleanor Coade
 Codd-neck bottle – Hiram Codd
 Coddington magnifier – Henry Coddington
 Colt revolver – Samuel Colt
 Coffey still – Aeneas Coffey
 Congreve rocket – Sir William Congreve, 1st Baronet
 Crompton's mule – Samuel Crompton
 Crookes tube – William Crookes
 Cunningham – Briggs Cunningham
 Daguerreotype – Louis Daguerre
 Dalén light – Gustaf Dalén
 Daly detector – Norman Richard Daly
 Daniell cell – John Frederic Daniell
 Davenport desk – Captain John Davenport
 Davis Gun – Cleland Davis
 Davy lamp – Humphry Davy
 Derrick – Thomas Derrick
 Derringer – Henry Deringer
 Dewar flask – James Dewar
 Diesel engine, diesel fuel – Rudolf Diesel
 Dimroth condenser – Otto Dimroth
 Divers's solution – Edward Divers
 Dr. Martens – Klaus Märtens
 Dolby noise-reduction system – Ray Dolby
 Doppler radar – Christian Doppler
 Draisine – Karl Drais
 Edison effect (Thermionic emission) – Thomas Edison
 Edison screw – Thomas Edison
 Ehrlich's reagent – Paul Ehrlich
 Éolienne Bollée – Ernest Sylvain Bollée
 Ericsson engine – John Ericsson
 Erlenmeyer flask – Emil Erlenmeyer
 Euclidean geometry – Euclid
 Fairbairn–Sykes fighting knife – William Ewart Fairbairn and Eric Anthony Sykes
 Faraday cage – Michael Faraday
 Farrimond friction hitch – Barry Farrimond
 Ferris wheel – George Washington Gale Ferris Jr.
 Flinders bar – Matthew Flinders
 Foley catheter – Frederic Foley
 Foucault pendulum – Léon Foucault 
 Francis turbine – James B. Francis
 Franklin stove – Benjamin Franklin
 Fresnel lens – Augustin-Jean Fresnel 
 Friedrichs condenser – Fritz Walter Paul Friedrichs
 Frost Airship Glider – William Frost

G to M

 

 Galil – Yisrael Galil 
 Gallup Poll – George Gallup
 Galvanometer, galvanic cell – Luigi Galvani
 Garand – John Garand 
 Gatling gun – Richard Jordan Gatling
 Gatso cameras – Maus Gatsonides
 Geiger counter – Hans Geiger
 Geiger–Müller tube – Hans Geiger and Walther Müller
 George Foreman Grill – George Foreman
 Gillette safety razor – King Camp Gillette 
 Gladstone bag – William Ewart Gladstone
 Glauber's salt – Johann Rudolf Glauber
 Gore-Tex – Bill Gore
 Graham condenser – Thomas D. Graham
 Graham cracker – Rev Sylvester Graham
 Gramme dynamo – Zénobe Gramme
 Gregorian telescope – James Gregory
 Guillotine – Joseph-Ignace Guillotin
 Gurney Stove – Goldsworthy Gurney
 Halkett boat – Peter Halkett
 Hallidie ropeway – Andrew Smith Hallidie
 Halligan bar – Hugh Halligan
 Hammond organ – Laurens Hammond 
 Heimlich Maneuver – Henry Heimlich
 Hele-Shaw clutch – Henry Selby Hele-Shaw
 Henry rifle – Benjamin Tyler Henry
 Higgins boat – Andrew Higgins
 Hobbs Meter – John Weston Hobbs
 Holter Monitor – Norman Holter
 Hoover – William Henry Hoover
 Horlicks – James and William Horlick
 Horsley–Clarke apparatus – Victor Horsley and Robert H. Clarke
 Horstmann suspension – Sidney Horstmann
 Howell torpedo – John Adams Howell
 Humphrey pump – H. A. Humphrey
 Hutchinson Patent Stopper – Charles G. Hutchinson
 Inglis Bridge – Charles Inglis
 Jacuzzi – Candido Jacuzzi
 Jacquard loom – Joseph Marie Jacquard
 Josephson junction – Brian David Josephson
 Kalashnikov – Mikhail Kalashnikov 
 Kaplan turbine – Viktor Kaplan
 Kay's flying shuttle – John Kay
 Kégresse track – Adolphe Kégresse
 Kelvin bridge – William Thomson, 1st Baron Kelvin
 Ketchum Grenade – William F. Ketchum
 Kilner jar – John Kilner
 Kipp's apparatus – Petrus Jacobus Kipp
 Krarup cable – Carl Emil Krarup
 Land Camera – Edwin H. Land
 Langmuir probe – Irving Langmuir
 Leigh light – Humphrey de Verd Leigh 
 Leotard – Jules Léotard
 Leslie speaker – Donald Leslie
 Lewis gun – Isaac Newton Lewis
 Littlejohn adaptor – František Janeček
 Loganberry – James Harvey Logan
 Lyot filter, Lyot stop and Lyot depolarizer – Bernard Lyot
 Macadam, tarmac – John Loudon McAdam
 Machmeter – Ernst Mach
 Mackintosh – Charles Macintosh
 Mae West – Mae West
 Mallet's Mortar – Robert Mallet
 Manby Mortar – George William Manby
 Mansard roof – François Mansart
 Marconi rig – Guglielmo Marconi
 Mason jar – John Landis Mason
 Masonite - William H. Mason
 Mausoleum – Mausolus
 Maxim gun – Hiram Stevens Maxim
 McCormick reaper – Cyrus McCormick
 Melba toast, Peach Melba, Melba sauce – Nellie Melba
 Melvillade – Robert Melville
 Mercator projection – Gerardus Mercator
 Mercerised cotton – John Mercer
 Michelson interferometer – Albert Abraham Michelson
 Mills bomb – William Mills
 Minié ball, Minié rifle – Claude-Étienne Minié
 Molotov cocktail – Vyacheslav Molotov
 Momsen Lung, Charles B. Momsen
 Moog synthesizer – Robert Moog 
 Morse code – Samuel Morse
 Muntz metal – George Frederic Muntz
 Murphy bed - William Lawrence Murphy

N to S

 Napier's bones – John Napier
 Newcomen steam engine – Thomas Newcomen
 Newtonian telescope – Isaac Newton
 Newton's Cradle – Isaac Newton
 Nissen hut – Peter Norman Nissen
 Nordenfelt gun – Thorsten Nordenfelt
 Northrop Loom – James Henry Northrop
 Odhner Arithmometer – Willgodt Theophil Odhner
 Odón device – Jorge Odón
 Ormerod link – Edward Ormerod
 Ostwald viscometer – Wilhelm Ostwald
 Owen submachine gun – Evelyn Owen
 Parkesine – Alexander Parkes
 Pasteurization – Louis Pasteur
 Patchett gun – George William Patchett
 Pavlova – Anna Pavlova
 Payne's grey – William Payne
 Peavey – Joseph Peavey
 Pelton turbine – Lester Allan Pelton
 Penning trap – Frans Michel Penning
 Petri dish – Julius Richard Petri
 Phillips screw – Henry F. Phillips
 Pilates – Joseph Pilates
 Pimm's – James Pimm
 Pinchbeck – Christopher Pinchbeck
 Pintsch gas – Julius Pintsch
 Pitman shorthand – Isaac Pitman
 Pitot tube – Henri Pitot
 Plimsoll line – Samuel Plimsoll
 Prince Rupert's Drop – Prince Rupert of the Rhine
 Pulaski – Ed Pulaski
 Pupin coil – Mihajlo Idvorski Pupin
 Puretic power block – Mario Puratić
 Prusik – Karl Prusik
 Raglan sleeve – Fitzroy Somerset, 1st Baron Raglan
 Raman spectroscopy – C. V. Raman
 Rawlplug – John Joseph Rawlings
 Richter magnitude scale – Charles Francis Richter
 Ripley machine gun – Ezra Ripley
 Rorschach test – Hermann Rorschach
 Rozière balloon – Jean-François Pilâtre de Rozier
 Rubik's Cube – Ernő Rubik
 Rumford fireplace – Benjamin Thompson
 Salk vaccine – Jonas Salk
 Salter's duck – Stephen Salter
 Sam Browne belt – Sam Browne
 Sandwich – Earl of Sandwich
 Savery engine – Thomas Savery
 Saxophone – Adolphe Sax
 Scavenger's daughter – Leonard Skeffington (or Skevington)
 Scheele's Green – Carl Wilhelm Scheele
 Schick test – Béla Schick
 Shrapnel shell – Henry Shrapnel
 Sousaphone – John Philip Sousa
 Southern blot – Edwin Southern
 Soyer stove – Alexis Soyer
 Spragg Bag – Terry Spragg
 Sprengel explosives, Sprengel Pump – Hermann Sprengel
 Stabinger viscometer – Hans Stabinger
 Stanhope – Henry FitzRoy Stanhope
 Stark spectroscopy – Johannes Stark
 Stelzer engine – Frank Stelzer
 Stephenson's Rocket - Robert Stephenson
 Sten – Reginald V. Shepherd, Harold Turpin, Enfield
 Stetson – John Batterson Stetson
 Stiefografie – Helmut Stief
 Stillson wrench – Daniel Chapman Stillson
 Stirling engine – Rev. Robert Stirling
 Stockbridge damper – George H. Stockbridge
 Stokes mortar – Wilfred Stokes
 Strowger switch – Almon Brown Strowger
 Swallow float – John C. Swallow

T to Z

 Tesla coil, Tesla turbine – Nikola Tesla
 Theremin – Léon Theremin
 Thompson submachine gun – John T. Thompson
 Tobin tax — James Tobin
 Tupperware – Earl Silas Tupper
 Ubbelohde viscometer – Leo Ubbelohde
 Uzi – Uziel Gal 
 Venn diagram – John Venn
 Vernier scale – Pierre Vernier
 Very pistol, Very flare – Edward Wilson Very
 Vigreux column – Henri Vigreux
 Voltaic pile – Alessandro Volta
 Wagner tuba – Richard Wagner
 Wankel engine – Felix Wankel
 Wardian case – Nathaniel Bagshaw Ward
 Waterhouse stop – John Waterhouse
 Watt's linkage & Watt steam engine – James Watt
 Wedgwood porcelain – Wedgwood family
 Welin breech block – Axel Welin
 Wellington boot – Duke of Wellington
 Wells turbine – Alan Arthur Wells
 Westinghouse air brake – George Westinghouse
 Weston cell – Edward Weston
 Wheatstone bridge – Charles Wheatstone
 Whitehead Torpedo – Robert Whitehead
 Whitworth thread – Joseph Whitworth
 Wiegand wire – John R. Wiegand
 Wilhelmy plate – Ludwig Wilhelmy
 Wilson chamber – Charles Thomson Rees Wilson
 Winchester rifle – Oliver Winchester
 Windsor knot – Edward VII of the United Kingdom
 Winogradsky column – Sergei Winogradsky
 Wollaston landscape lens – William Hyde Wollaston
 Wollaston wire – William Hyde Wollaston
 Woodruff key – W.N. Woodruff
 Wood's glass – Robert W. Wood
 Yablochkov candle – Pavel Yablochkov
 Yale lock – Linus Yale, Jr.
 Zamboni – Frank Zamboni
 Zamboni pile – Giuseppe Zamboni
 Zeppelin – Ferdinand von Zeppelin

See also
 List of inventors
 List of inventors killed by their own inventions
 List of inventions named after places
 Timeline of historic inventions
 List of scientists
 Lists of etymologies
 Scientific phenomena named after people
 List of named inorganic compounds

References

Lists of eponyms
Lists of inventions or discoveries